The group stage of the 2008–09 UEFA Cup is the second stage of the competition proper. The draw took place on 7 October 2008 at UEFA headquarters in Nyon, Switzerland. Group stage matches began on 23 October 2008 and concluded on 18 December 2008. The top three teams in each group progressed to the Round of 32, to be joined by the eight third-place finishers from the Champions League group stage.

Seedings
The following teams qualified for the group stage:

Pot 1 contained teams ranked between 2 and 39: Pot 2 held teams ranked 40 to 71, Pot 3 held teams ranked 72 to 88, and Pot 4 teams ranked 91 to 122 together with unranked teams from England and Spain. Pot 5 held the remaining teams.

Dinamo Zagreb, and all the Pot 5 teams, had beaten higher-ranked teams in the first round. Lech Poznań and Žilina had also beaten higher-ranked teams in the Second Qualifying Round. Seven of the eight teams in Pot 5 qualified for the Round of 32, Žilina being the only exception. In contrast, only five of the eight teams in Pot 1 managed to do the same, as Sevilla, Benfica and Schalke 04 were eliminated.

Tie-breaking criteria
Based on paragraph 6.06 in the UEFA regulations for the current season, if two or more teams are equal on points on completion of the group matches, the following criteria are applied to determine the rankings:
superior goal difference from all group matches played;
higher number of goals scored;
higher number of goals scored away;
higher number of wins;
higher number of away wins;
higher number of coefficient points accumulated by the club in question, as well as its association, over the previous five seasons.

Groups

Group A

Group B

Group C

Group D

Group E

Group F

Group G

Group H

References

External links
Group stage standings

Group Stage
2008-09